Ivan Popov is an Australian Greco-Roman wrestler of Russian descent.

In 2010, he won a gold medal at the 2010 Commonwealth Games in the Men's Greco-Roman 120 kg division, Australia's first win in 32 years.

He attempted to qualify to wrestle for the 2012 Olympics.

In 2016, he finished 2nd at the 2016 African & Oceania Wrestling Olympic Qualification Tournament to earn an Olympic berth.

He is the son of Olympic bronze medalist and world champion Vladimir Popov.

References

External links
 

Living people
Australian people of Russian descent
Australian male sport wrestlers
Olympic wrestlers of Australia
Wrestlers at the 2016 Summer Olympics
Commonwealth Games medallists in wrestling
Commonwealth Games gold medallists for Australia
Year of birth missing (living people)
Wrestlers at the 2010 Commonwealth Games
Medallists at the 2010 Commonwealth Games